William Nedham may refer to:
 William Nedham (British politician)
 William Nedham (Jamaican politician)